Sabah Parks is a conservation-based statutory body established in 1964 with the purpose of conserving the scenic, scientific and historic heritage of the state of Sabah, Malaysia, on the island of Borneo. The organisation is also responsible for the management and promotion of the various protected reserves in Sabah, in particular those designated as national parks. It is also mandated to develop tourism-friendly facilities to accommodate tourist arrivals to these reserves and ensure that the state of the reserves is not compromised. The first choice for inclusion in a park system was Mount Kinabalu.  As a result, Kinabalu Park was gazetted in 1964, and today it is designated as a World Heritage Site.

Sabah Parks is managed by a board of trustees also known as Sabah Parks Trustees, which consists of a chairman, deputy chairman, three ex officio members, four other members, and a director.

National Parks 
 Kinabalu Park
 Turtle Islands Park
 Tunku Abdul Rahman Park
 Pulau Tiga Park
 Tawau Hills Park
 Crocker Range Park
 Tun Sakaran Marine Park
 Sipadan Island Park (land has been gazetted)

See also
 List of national parks of Malaysia
 Department of Wildlife and National Parks

External links 
 Sabah Parks homepage
 CAIMS Conservation Areas Information and Monitoring System - Sabah Forestry Department
 Sabah Forestry Department

Nature conservation in Malaysia
National parks of Malaysia
Government of Sabah
National park administrators
1964 establishments in Malaysia
Government agencies established in 1964
Protected areas of Sabah